The South Carolina Department of Natural Resources (DNR) is a South Carolina state agency charged with regulating hunting, fishing, boating, duck stamp orders,  and the conservation efforts of the state government.

It is directed by seven-member Board of Directors. The governor of South Carolina appoints a member from each of the state's congressional districts, in addition to one at-large board member. The board or governor may appoint citizens advisory panels to provide recommendations on agency programs.

The Department of Natural Resources also oversees the state's soil and water conservation districts, which are special-purpose districts contiguous with each of South Carolina's 46 counties. Each conservation district is managed by six-member boards. Three members of each board are appointed through the Department of Natural Resources, while the other half are directly elected.

DNR senior staff

Director - Robert H. Boyles Jr.
Chief of Staff - Shannon F. Bobertz
DNR Divisions:
Ken Rentiers, Deputy Director (Land, Water and Conservation Division)
COL Chisolm Frampton, Deputy Director (Law Enforcement Division)
Blaik Keppler, Deputy Director (Marine Resources Division)
Angie Cassella, Deputy Director (Division of Administration)
Emily Cope, Deputy Director (Wildlife and Freshwater Fisheries Division)

DNR board members
Norman F. Pulliam, Chairman (4th congressional district)
Michael E. "Mike" Hutchins, Vice Chairman (2nd congressional district)
Dr. Mark F. Hartley (1st congressional district)
Jake Rasor, Jr. (3rd congressional district)
James Carlisle Oxner III (5th congressional district)
Duane Swygert (6th congressional district)
Keith C. Hinson (7th congressional district)

Law enforcement
The Division of Law Enforcement is responsible for enforcement of state and federal laws that govern hunting, recreational and commercial fishing, recreational boating, and other natural resources conservation concerns. The division conducts South Carolina’s hunter and boater education courses, as well as other outreach programs including the Take One Make One and Archery in the Schools programs aimed at introducing youth to the sport of hunting. The division is responsible for investigating boating and hunting accidents, and DNR officers regularly conduct search and rescue missions in outlying areas and assist other law enforcement agencies in investigations. The Division has officers trained in underwater diving that assist in law enforcement, search and rescue, and evidence recovery missions. The Division also utilizes aircraft for law enforcement patrol, search and rescue, and other department missions. The division and its officers are called upon to provide homeland security related to water borne activities including commercial ship escorts, and hydroelectric dam, nuclear facility, and energy plant security.

South Carolina's corps of natural resources enforcement officers is organized into four regions covering groups of the state's 46 counties and coastal marine shoreline and waters out to 200 miles. A 24-hour toll-free number is maintained for emergencies requiring immediate law enforcement assistance from a natural resources officer. Any person may call this number anonymously to report a conservation law violation or information that could lead to the arrest of a violator and become eligible for a cash reward through the Operation Game Thief Program.

History and purpose

The department

The agency as organized on July 1, 1994, under the S.C. Restructuring Act is composed of the former Wildlife and Marine Resources Department, Water Resources Commission (non-regulatory programs), Land Resources Commission (non-regulatory programs), State Geological Survey (State Geologist), and S.C. Migratory Waterfowl Committee. These have been combined into the present division structure. Robert H. Boyles Jr. is the current director of the agency.

The board

The SCDNR is governed by the seven-member S.C. Natural Resources Board, with one member representing each of the state's six Congressional Districts and one at large. The board meets monthly. Citizen advisory committees meet periodically.

The public is invited to attend all meetings, and comment is encouraged. Upcoming meetings are announced through news releases, local newspapers, or the DNR News and Video Section. Also, SCDNR Board Meeting minutes are available as they are approved by the Board.

See also
List of State Fish and Wildlife Management Agencies in the U.S.
List of law enforcement agencies in South Carolina

References

External links
 

Natural Resources
State environmental protection agencies of the United States
Natural resources agencies in the United States
Environment of South Carolina